Moasseseh-ye Kamili (also Romanized as Moasseseh-ye Kamīlī) is a village in Veys Rural District, Veys District, Bavi County, Khuzestan Province, Iran. At the 2006 census, its population was 24, in 4 families.

References 

Populated places in Bavi County